Edward Daniell may refer to:

 Edward Daniell (cricketer) (1815–1875), English cricketer
 Edward Thomas Daniell (1804–1842), English landscape painter and etcher